Vermeersch is a Dutch toponymic surname most common in the Belgian province of West Flanders. It is a contraction of van der Meersch, where meersch (with the same root as "marsh") is a Flemish term for a floodplain. Notable people with the surname include:

Etienne Vermeersch (born 1934), Belgian philosopher
Florian Vermeersch (born 1997), Belgian cyclist
Gianni Vermeersch (born 1992), Belgian cyclist
Hannah Vermeersch (born 1992), Australian rower
Hans Vermeersch (born 1957), Belgian composer and conductor 
Jeannette Vermeersch (1910–2001), French politician
Lowie Vermeersch (born 1974), Belgian designer
Niels Vermeersch (born 1988)
Paul Vermeersch (born 1973), Canadian poet
Peter Vermeersch (born 1959), Belgian musician and composer
Sem Vermeersch (born 1968), Belgian academic
Stephan Vermeersch, Belgian clarinettist and saxophonist
Van der Meersch
Anke Van dermeersch (born 1972), Belgian politician and former beauty queen
Jacob van der Meersch, Governor of Mauritius for the Dutch East India company from 1644 to 1648
Jean-André van der Meersch (1734–1792), Flemish general, leading figure in the Brabant Revolution
Maxence Van Der Meersch (1910–2001), French Flemish writer

Dutch-language surnames
Surnames of Belgian origin